Erich Schultze (22 May 1890 – 18 March 1938) was a German swimmer. He competed in the men's 100 metre backstroke event at the 1912 Summer Olympics.

References

1890 births
1938 deaths
German male swimmers
Olympic swimmers of Germany
Swimmers at the 1912 Summer Olympics
Swimmers from Berlin
Male backstroke swimmers